The fearful owl (Asio solomonensis) is a medium-sized owl endemic to the Solomon Islands archipelago. It is generally seen at elevations of up to 800 m above sea level, where it is found in tall lowland or hill forests.

Description
It has a rufous facial disk and distinct white eyebrows. The inner edge of the facial disk is also white. It is usually mottled brown with deep ochre underparts and blackish streaks. This species may be confused with the Solomon hawk owl, although the latter is slightly smaller and more slender. It is also similar in appearance to the laughing owl, which is now extinct.

Its call is similar to a clear human scream, increasing in volume and tone and emitted in a series, each pulse being repeated at intervals of ten seconds.

Distribution and habitat
The fearful owl is endemic to the island of Bougainville in Papua New Guinea and to Choiseul Island and to Santa Isabel Island in the Solomon Islands.

Behaviour
Though generally nesting in tree holes and cracks, nests of the fearful owl have been found on the epiphyte-covered branches of large fig trees (Ficus spp.), both in primary forest and close to the forest edge and near gardens.

Status
The fearful owl preys on phalangers, especially the northern common cuscus. Overhunting of the northern common cuscus may be threatening the fearful owl, although habitat loss due to logging is the primary cause of population decline.

References

External links
BirdLife Species Factsheet.

fearful owl
Birds of Bougainville Island
Birds of the Solomon Islands
Owls of Oceania
fearful owl
Taxobox binomials not recognized by IUCN